SeatGeek Stadium is a soccer-specific stadium in Bridgeview, Illinois, about twelve miles southwest of downtown Chicago. It is the home stadium of the Chicago Red Stars of the National Women's Soccer League, Chicago Fire FC II of the MLS Next Pro, Chicago Hounds of the Major League Rugby, and Chicago State Cougars men's and women's soccer teams of the NCAA Division I. The stadium has also hosted the Chicago Fire of Major League Soccer, Chicago Machine of Major League Lacrosse, Chicago Bliss of the Legends Football League, and Chicago House AC of the National Independent Soccer Association. Originally Toyota Park when it opened on June 11, 2006, the facility has a capacity of 20,000 and was developed at a cost of around $100 million. The naming rights agreement with SeatGeek went into effect following the Fire's 2018 season.

History
The Chicago Fire entered Major League Soccer as an expansion team in 1998, playing its first four seasons at Soldier Field in Chicago, which they shared with the National Football League (NFL)'s Chicago Bears. Beginning in 2002, the club moved to Cardinal Stadium (now Benedetti–Wehrli Stadium) in Naperville for two seasons while Soldier Field was renovated, leading to calls for a soccer-specific venue. The Fire received several bids before announcing Bridgeview as the winner in 2003. Construction on the Bridgeview venue began on November 30, 2004, and was completed on June 11, 2006.

Naming rights
In 2006, Toyota entered into a ten-year naming rights agreement and renamed the new stadium Toyota Park. In 2016, it was reported that Toyota had opted against renewing their naming rights. Despite this, the stadium continued to be known as Toyota Park through the 2018 season. Afterwards, new sponsor SeatGeek assumed stadium naming rights starting with the 2019 Fire season.

The naming rights agreement signed in 2018 was the first such agreement SeatGeek entered into. It was reported that as part of the deal, SeatGeek would also serve as the venue's primary ticketing service starting in 2019. The company reportedly promised that they would work to "bring more live programming, including premier concerts, music festivals and international sporting events" to the stadium.

Future
The Fire and Bridgeview began negotiating a re-evaluation of the stadium lease in 2018, shortly after Joe Mansueto acquired his stake in the team. In early April 2019, several media reports emerged about a potential contract buyout that would allow the Fire to move back to Chicago, playing temporarily at Soldier Field once again. On May 8, 2019, Fire president Nelson Rodriguez confirmed that the team was negotiating a tentative deal with the village to terminate their lease, which was slated to run through 2036, at an estimated cost of $65 million. The terms of the deal were confirmed on July 9, 2019. In consideration for releasing the Fire and MLS from the lease, the Fire will put money toward a "multisport recreation and entertainment center" at the site. The Red Stars have no plans to move. On January 27, 2021, Chicago House AC of the NISA announced that they had selected SeatGeek Stadium as their home.

Nevertheless, in 2022, because of Soldier Field availability, the Fire played late-season matches at the stadium and may still play other matches there in future seasons while it solves its Chicago stadium situation. Moreover, its MLS Next Pro affiliate Chicago Fire FC II is based out of Bridgeview.

Design

Incorporating traditional stadium features from American and European facilities, SeatGeek Stadium includes predominantly covered seating, a brick facade and stone entry archway, and first rows placed fewer than three yards from the field.

A practice facility with two fields (one natural grass; the other artificial turf) for the Fire club and its youth programs lies next to the stadium. The stadium's design allows expansion of 50% more seating at negligible expense. Its  natural grass field's $1.7 million turf management system comprises full heating, drainage, and aeration capabilities.

A permanent stage allows the stadium to host concerts and quickly change configurations. A typical conversion from soccer to stage takes no more than 18 hours. The field accommodates 8,000 additional chairback seats for concerts and other stage events. SeatGeek Stadium is currently operated by Spectra.

In July 2016, two large-scale murals were designed and painted by artist Tony Passero on the east and west walls of the stadium's stage suites. The murals measure 14 feet high by 27 feet in length, and are named "Offense" and "Defense".

Major soccer events

On November 27, 2010, SeatGeek Stadium was the venue for the 2011 FIFA Women's World Cup qualification match between USA and Italy; USA defeated Italy 1–0 and advanced to the World Cup. SeatGeek Stadium was the venue for the 2006 MLS All-Star Game, in which the MLS side defeated Chelsea F.C. 1–0. The stadium also hosted the 2006 Lamar Hunt U.S. Open Cup's final, in which the Chicago Fire defeated the LA Galaxy 3–1.

SeatGeek Stadium hosts annual friendly matches between Chicago Fire and the popular European and Mexican clubs, which in the past included A.C. Milan, Everton, C.D. Guadalajara, Club America, Santos Laguna, and others. SeatGeek Stadium hosted four matches during the group stage of the 2014 CONCACAF Women's Championship.

Rugby union
SeatGeek Stadium hosted its first international rugby match in 2007, with the United States Eagles losing 6–10 to provincial side Munster. In June 2008 the stadium hosted three matches of the Churchill Cup, including United States vs Canada, England Saxons vs Scotland A, and Ireland Wolfhounds vs Argentina Jaguares. On June 6, 2009 the stadium hosted a 2009 mid-year rugby test series match between United States and Wales in a warmup match for the USA in its campaign to qualify for the 2011 Rugby World Cup.

Other sports events
SeatGeek Stadium served as the home site for Roosevelt University men's and women's soccer matches from 2010 until 2019, when the team moved their matches to Illinois Institute of Technology's on-campus stadium. It was announced in December 2019 that the Chicago Blitz of the Extreme Football League would play their inaugural season at SeatGeek Stadium.

The first college football game at the stadium took place on September 7, 2013 between DIII schools John Carroll and Saint Norbert, a game which John Carroll won 41-0.

For their 2021 season, the Chicago State Cougars men's and women's soccer teams are playing at the stadium.

Concerts and music festivals

From 2006 to 2015,  SeatGeek Stadium has been the host venue for Chicago radio station B96's annual summer concert, The B96 Pepsi Summer Bash.  The Crossroads Guitar Festival was held on July 28, 2007 and again on June 26, 2010.

Concerts

Music festivals

Accessibility 
Pace operates the #387 SeatGeek Stadium Express nonstop from the Midway Orange Line Station for Chicago Fire matches and special events. A $2.475 million transit center operated by Pace was constructed at the east end of the stadium's parking lot in 2014.

The Fire had  also provided bus transportation from nine different bar locations in the city to and from the games. However upon moving back to Soldier Field that service is no longer offered for SeakGeek Stadium.

See also
 List of sports venues with the name Toyota

References

External links

SeatGeek Stadium official website
SeatGeek Stadium at StadiumDB.com

Chicago Fire FC
Chicago Red Stars
Lacrosse venues in Illinois
Former Major League Lacrosse venues
Premier Lacrosse League venues
Former Major League Soccer stadiums
Music venues in Illinois
National Women's Soccer League stadiums
Roosevelt Lakers
Rugby union stadiums in Chicago
Soccer venues in Chicago
Women's Professional Soccer stadiums
Former National Independent Soccer Association stadiums
Defunct National Premier Soccer League stadiums
Toyota
Major League Rugby stadiums